Sibuhuan is a district which is also the capital of Padang Lawas Regency, North Sumatra, Indonesia. Sibuhuan is the administrative center of Padang Lawas Regency which is a formerly part of South Tapanuli Regency.
and has a website: http://sibuhuan.id and http://itsibuhuan.blogspot.com/

Populated places in North Sumatra
Regency seats of North Sumatra